Michael J. "Mike" Kelloway  (born September 9, 1970) is a Canadian politician who was elected to represent the riding of Cape Breton—Canso as a member of the Liberal Party in the House of Commons of Canada in the 2019 Canadian federal election.

Electoral record

References

External links

Living people
Liberal Party of Canada MPs
Members of the House of Commons of Canada from Nova Scotia
People from Glace Bay
21st-century Canadian politicians
Year of birth uncertain
1970 births